Trupanea is a genus of tephritid or fruit flies in the family Tephritidae.

Recent changes in nomenclature 
Tephritis kukunoria Hendel, 1927 transferred to the genus Trupanea as the elder synonym of Trupanea pterostigma Wang, 1996.

List of species 

T. actinobola (Loew, 1873)
T. ageratae Benjamin, 1934
T. aira (Walker, 1849)
T. alboapicata (Malloch, 1931)
T. aldrichi Aczél, 1953
T. ambigua (Shiraki, 1933)
T. amoena (Frauenfeld, 1857)
T. andobana Munro, 1964
T. antiqua (Walker, 1853)
T. apicalis Hardy, 1980
T. arboreae Hardy, 1980
T. argentina (Brèthes, 1908)
T. arizonensis (Malloch, 1942)
T. artemisiae Hardy, 1980
T. asteria (Schiner, 1868)
T. asteroides (Hendel, 1914)
T. aucta Bezzi, 1913
T. austera (Hering, 1942)
T. basiflava (Hering, 1942)
T. basistriga (Malloch, 1933)
T. beardsleyi Hardy, 1980
T. bidensicola Hardy, 1980
T. bifida Hardy & Drew, 1996
T. bisdiversa (Bezzi, 1924)
T. bisetosa (Coquillett, 1899)
T. bisreducta (Bezzi, 1924)
T. bistigmosa (Hering, 1941)
T. bistriga (Malloch, 1933)
T. bonariensis (Brèthes, 1908)
T. brasiliensis Aczél, 1953
T. brevitarsis (Hering, 1941)
T. browni Munro, 1964
T. brunneipennis Hardy, 1973
T. bullocki (Malloch, 1933)
T. caerulea Munro, 1964
T. californica (Malloch, 1942)
T. candida (Hering, 1942)
T. celaenoptera Hardy, 1980
T. centralis (Malloch, 1931)
T. chariessa (Hendel, 1914)
T. chilensis (Macquart, 1843)
T. chrysanthemifolii Frias, 1985
T. colligata Munro, 1964
T. completa (Malloch, 1931)
T. conjuncta (Adams, 1904)
T. constans Munro, 1964
T. convergens (Hering, 1936)
T. cosmia (Schiner, 1868)
T. crassipes (Thomson, 1869)
T. crassitarsis (Hering, 1940)
T. cratericola (Grimshaw, 1901)
T. curvata Munro, 1964
T. cuspidiflexa Munro, 1964
T. cyclops (Hendel, 1914)
T. dacetoptera (Phillips, 1923)
T. daphne (Wiedemann, 1830)
T. dealbata Munro, 1964
T. decepta Hardy, 1970
T. decora Loew, 1861
T. dempta Hardy, 1980
T. denotata Hardy, 1980
T. digrammata (Hering, 1947)
T. diluta (Enderlein, 1911)
T. discyrta Munro, 1964
T. distincta (Shiraki, 1933)
T. diversa (Wiedemann, 1830)
T. dubautiae (Bryan, 1921)
T. dubia (Malloch, 1931)
T. dumosa (Munro, 1940)
T. durvillei (Macquart, 1843)
T. eclipta Benjamin, 1934
T. edwardsi (Malloch, 1933)
T. erasa (Malloch, 1942)
T. erigeroni Freidberg, 1974
T. excepta (Malloch, 1933)
T. extensa (Malloch, 1931)
T. falcata Munro, 1964
T. femoralis (Thomson, 1869)
T. fenwicki (Malloch, 1931)
T. flavivena (Hering, 1937)
T. foliosi Frias, 1985
T. footei Frias, 1985
T. formosae (Hendel, 1927)
T. furcifera (Bezzi, 1924)
T. glauca (Thomson, 1869)
T. gratiosa (Ito, 1952)
T. guttistella (Hering, 1951)
T. helota Hering, 1941
T. hendeli (Hering, 1941)
T. heronensis Hardy & Drew, 1996
T. horologii Munro, 1964
T. imperfecta (Coquillett, 1902)
T. inaequabilis (Hering, 1942)
T. infissa Munro, 1964
T. inscia Munro, 1960
T. insularum (Becker, 1908)
T. intermedia Munro, 1933
T. isolata Hardy, 1973
T. jonesi (Curran, 1932)
T. joycei Hardy, 1980
T. keralaensis Agarwal, Grewal et al., 1989
T. kraussi Munro, 1964
T. latinota Hardy, 1988
T. lignoptera (Munro, 1929)
T. lilloi Aczél, 1953
T. limpidapex (Grimshaw, 1901)
T. lipochaetae Hardy, 1980
T. longipennis (Malloch, 1931)
T. lunifrons (Bezzi, 1924)
T. lyneborgi Hardy, 1970
T. maculaminuta (Munro, 1929)
T. maculigera Foote, 1960
T. mallochi (Hering, 1940)
T. marginalis Hardy, 1980
T. megaspila Hardy, 1980
T. melantherae Munro, 1964
T. metoeca (Hendel, 1914)
T. mevarna (Walker, 1849)
T. modesta (Blanchard, 1854)
T. multisetosa (Hering, 1936)
T. mutabilis (Hering, 1941)
T. neodaphne (Malloch, 1933)
T. nigricornis (Coquillett, 1899)
T. nigricornuta (Hering, 1942)
T. nigripennis Hardy, 1980
T. nigriseta (Malloch, 1933)
T. notata Hardy & Drew, 1996
T. novarae (Schiner, 1868)
T. nubilata (Hering, 1936)
T. nudipes (Hering, 1938)
T. nymphula (Blanchard, 1854)
T. obsoleta (Hendel, 1914)
T. ochthlera Munro, 1964
T. okinawaensis Shiraki, 1968
T. omphale (Hering, 1936)
T. oppleta Munro, 1964
T. opprimata (Hering, 1941)
T. orfila (Hering, 1940)
T. ornum Norrbom, 1999
T. pantosticta Hardy, 1980
T. paradaphne (Hering, 1953)
T. paragoga (Hering, 1936)
T. paraplesia (Hendel, 1914)
T. patagonica (Brèthes, 1908)
T. paupercula (Hering, 1940)
T. pekeloi Hardy, 1980
T. pentheres (Hendel, 1914)
T. pentziana (Munro, 1933)
T. perkinsi Hardy, 1980
T. peruviana (Malloch, 1942)
T. phrycta (Hendel, 1914)
T. pictofracta Munro, 1964
T. platensis (Brèthes, 1908)
T. plaumanni (Hering, 1940)
T. pollens Munro, 1957
T. polyclona (Loew, 1873)
T. porteri (Séguy, 1933)
T. proavita (Hering, 1939)
T. prolata Hardy & Drew, 1996
T. prominens Munro, 1964
T. propinqua (Hering, 1941)
T. pseudoamoena Freidberg, 1974
T. pseudodaphne Hering, 1942
T. pseudovicina (Hering, 1947)
T. pteralis Agarwal, Grewal et al., 1989
T. pubescens (Kieffer & Jörgensen, 1910)
T. pusilla Hardy & Drew, 1996
T. putata (Hering, 1940)
T. queenslandensis Hardy & Drew, 1996
T. radifera (Coquillett, 1899)
T. reducta (Hendel, 1914)
T. renschi (Hering, 1941)
T. repleta (Bezzi, 1918)
T. richteri Hering, 1956
T. rufa Hardy, 1988
T. sandoana (Munro, 1938)
T. sarangana (Curran, 1931)
T. sedata Munro, 1957
T. semiguttata (Becker, 1919)
T. setifrons (Malloch, 1933)
T. shaula Dirlbek, 1975
T. signata Foote, 1960
T. simplex (Malloch, 1932)
T. sirhindiensis Agarwal & Kapoor, 1988
T. solivaga (Hering, 1942)
T. spadix Munro, 1964
T. stellata (Fuesslin, 1775)
T. stenoptera (Hendel, 1914)
T. stulta (Hering, 1941)
T. subsetosa Munro, 1964
T. superdecora (Bezzi, 1924)
T. swezeyi (Bryan, 1921)
T. syrmophora (Hering, 1942)
T. teitensis Munro, 1964
T. terryi Hardy, 1988
T. tersa Munro, 1964
T. thuriferae Frias, 1985
T. tubulata Munro, 1964
T. tucumanensis (Malloch, 1933)
T. unimaculata (Malloch, 1931)
T. unimaculosa (Hering, 1941)
T. vernoniae Hardy, 1973
T. vicina (Wulp, 1900)
T. viciniformis Foote, 1987
T. vittigera (Malloch, 1931)
T. vulpina (Hering, 1942)
T. watti (Malloch, 1931)
T. wheeleri (Curran, 1932)
T. xanthochaeta (Munro, 1929)
T. zonata (Hendel, 1914)

References

Tephritinae
Tephritidae genera
Taxa named by Franz von Paula Schrank